Dimitrios Zambakos Pasha (1831 – 1913) was an Ottoman Greek liberal politician and physician, who was one of the leading surgeons in the Ottoman Empire. He was considered to be among the founders of the Ottoman Parliament.

References 

1831 births
1913 deaths
Greek surgeons
Greeks from the Ottoman Empire